Iwadare (written: 岩垂) is a Japanese surname. Notable people with the surname include:

, Japanese businessman
, Japanese video game composer

Japanese-language surnames